Events from the year 1684 in Denmark.

Incumbents
 Monarch – Christian V
 Grand Chancellor – Frederik Ahlefeldt

Events
 7 May – Christian V issues an order that deposes Adolph Esmit and names Gabriel Milan as Governor of St. Thomas in the Danish West Indies.
 6 November – The Engineer Regiment is founded.

Undated
 Royal Artillery Corps is founded in Copenhagen.
 Gustav Wilhelm von Wedel (1641–1717) is promoted to general in Norway.

Births
 26 July – Peder Benzon, Supreme Court justice and landowner (died 1735)
 30 November – Andreas Møller, portrait painter (died 1762)

Deaths
 18 April – Nikolaj Nissen, judge and landowner (born 1627)
 31 December – Hans Rostgaard, administrator (born 1625)

References

 
Denmark
Years of the 17th century in Denmark